Gennifer Choldenko (born October 20, 1957) is an American writer of popular books for children and adolescents.

Awards

Al Capone Does My Shirts was a finalist for both the British Carnegie Medal and the American Newbery Medal (Newbery Honor Book).

References

External links

Interview with Gennifer Choldenko at Mother Daughter Book Club.com
Q & A with Gennifer Choldenko by Publishers Weekly
KidsRead.com Author interview
 

1957 births
Living people
American children's writers
Newbery Honor winners
Writers from Santa Monica, California
21st-century American novelists
21st-century American women writers
American women children's writers
American women novelists